Jarmo Alatensiö (9 November 1963 – 23 April 2003) was a Finnish football player.

Alatensiö started his career in Porin Pallo-Toverit (later known as FC Jazz). He played three seasons in the Finnish top division Mestaruussarja and was signed by Swedish Allsvenskan club IK Brage in 1988. Two years later Alatensiö returned to Pori and played the rest of his career for PPT/FC Jazz. He won two Finnish championship titles with FC Jazz in 1993 and 1996.

Jarmo Alatensiö capped 19 times for the Finland national football team. He made his debut in September 1987 against Yugoslavia and scored his only international goal against Czechoslovakia in January 1988. After his professional years Alatensiö made a short career as a manager by coaching fourth and second tier clubs FC PoPa and MuSa at his home town Pori.

Honours

Club titles 
Finnish championship: 1993, 1996

Personal honours 
Ilta-Sanomat Player of the Year Award: 1987

References

External links 
Player profile of Jarmo Alatensiö  (in Finnish)

1963 births
2003 deaths
Finnish footballers
Finland international footballers
FC Jazz players
IK Brage players
Veikkausliiga players
Allsvenskan players
Finnish expatriate footballers
Expatriate footballers in Sweden
Association football midfielders
Musan Salama managers
People from Pomarkku
Sportspeople from Satakunta